The Home Fleet was a fleet of the Royal Navy that operated from the United Kingdom's territorial waters from 1902 with intervals until 1967. In 1967, it was merged with the Mediterranean Fleet creating the new Western Fleet.

Before the First World War, it consisted of the four Port Guard ships. In 1905 it was disestablished, and from 1905 to 1907 remaining ships at a lesser state of readiness were split into the reserve divisions (Devonport Division, Nore Division, and Portsmouth Division). During the First World War, it comprised some of the older ships of the Royal Navy. During the Second World War, it was the Royal Navy's main battle force in European waters.

Pre-First World War

In the first years of the 20th century, the Royal Navy had four 'Port Guard' ships, stationed in the major naval bases, partially to act as flagships for the admirals commanding at those ports. These vessels appear to have been stationed at the Nore, Portsmouth, and Plymouth, as well as one other major base.

On 1 October 1902, the Admiral Superintendent Naval Reserves, then Vice-Admiral Gerard Noel, was given the additional appointment of Commander-in-Chief, Home Fleet, and allotted a rear-admiral to serve under him as commander of the Home Squadron. "... the nucleus of the Home Fleet would consist of the four Port Guard ships, which would be withdrawn from their various scattered dockyards and turned into a unified and permanent sea-going command – the Home Squadron – based on Portland. Also under the direction of the commander-in-chief of the Home Fleet would be the Coast Guard ships, which would continue to be berthed for the most part in their respective district harbours in order to carry out their local duties, but would join the Home Squadron for sea work at least three times per year, at which point the assembled force – the Home Squadron and the Coast Guard vessels – would be known collectively as the Home Fleet." Rear-Admiral George Atkinson-Willes was Second-in-Command of the Home Fleet, with his flag in the battleship HMS Empress of India, at this time. In May 1903 Noel was succeeded as Commander-in-Chief by Vice-Admiral Sir Arthur Wilson.

On 14 December 1904, the Channel Fleet was re-styled the Atlantic Fleet and the Home Fleet became the Channel Fleet. In 1907, the Home Fleet was reformed with Vice-Admiral Francis Bridgeman in command, succeeded by Admiral Sir William May in 1909. Bridgeman took command again in 1911, and in the same year was succeeded by Admiral Sir George Callaghan. On 29 March 1912, a new structure of the fleet was announced, which came into force on 1 May 1912. The former Home Fleet, which was organised into four divisions, was divided into the First, Second and Third Fleets as Home Fleets. The Home Fleets were the Navy's unified home commands in British waters from 1912 to 1914. On 4 August 1914, as the First World War was breaking out, John Jellicoe was ordered to take command of the Fleet, which by his appointment order was renamed the Grand Fleet.

Commander-in-Chief, Home Fleet
Post holders during the pre-war period were:'''

Second in command
Post holders included:

Chief of staff
Post holders included:

Three Home Fleets, 1912–1914

The Home Fleets were a new organisation of the Royal Navy's unified home commands (First, Second and Third Fleets) instituted on 31 July 1912 to December 1914. The Commander-in-Chiefs of the three home commands reported to the Commander-in-Chief, Home Fleets.

Commander-in-Chief, Home Fleets

Second in command
Post holders included:

On 8 August 1914 units of the Home Fleets were distributed in accordance with Admiralty Fleet Order the majority of elements formed the new Grand Fleet others were assigned to the following units: Channel Fleet, Northern Patrol-Cruiser Force B, 7th Cruiser Squadron-Cruiser Force, 11th Cruiser Squadron-Cruiser Force E, Dover Patrol, Harwich Flotillas, 7th Destroyer Flotilla, 8th Destroyer Flotilla, 9th Destroyer Flotilla, 5th Submarine Flotilla, 6th Submarine Flotilla, 7th Submarine Flotilla and the 8th Submarine Flotilla.

Inter-war period

When the Grand Fleet was disbanded in April 1919, the more powerful ships were grouped into the Atlantic Fleet and the older ships became the "Home Fleet"; this arrangement lasted until late 1919, when the ships of the Home Fleet became the Reserve Fleet.

The name "Home Fleet" was resurrected in March 1932, as the new name for the Atlantic Fleet, following the Invergordon Mutiny. The Commander-in-Chief, Home Fleet in 1933 was Admiral Sir John Kelly. The Home Fleet comprised the flagship  leading a force that included the 2nd Battle Squadron (five more battleships), the Battlecruiser Squadron ( and ), the 2nd Cruiser Squadron (Vice-Admiral Edward Astley-Rushton) aboard  (three cruisers), three destroyer flotillas (27), a submarine flotilla (six), two aircraft carriers and associated vessels.

Commander-in-Chief, Home FleetPost holders during the inter-war period were:Second World War
History

The Home Fleet was the Royal Navy's main battle force in European waters during the Second World War. Its chief responsibility was to keep Germany's Kriegsmarine from breaking out of the North Sea. For this purpose, the First World War base at Scapa Flow was reactivated as it was well placed for interceptions of ships trying to run the blockade.

The two most surprising losses of the Home Fleet during the early part of the war were the sinking of the old battleship  by the German submarine  while supposedly safe in Scapa Flow, and the loss of the pride of the Navy, the battlecruiser , to the German battleship . 2nd Battle Squadron under Admiral Blagrove was effectively disestablished when he died in the sinking of Royal Oak.

The operational areas of the Home Fleet were not circumscribed, and units were detached to other zones quite freely. However, the southern parts of the North Sea and the English Channel were made separate commands for light forces, and the growing intensity of the Battle of the Atlantic led to the creation of Western Approaches Command. Only with the destruction of the German battleship  in 1944 did the Home Fleet assume a lower priority, and most of its heavy units were withdrawn to be sent to the Far East.

Post holder sources for the Second World War:

Second in command
Post holders included:

Post-Second World War

As the Cold War began, greater emphasis was placed on protecting the North Atlantic sea lanes from the Soviet Union in concert with other Western countries. Admiral Sir Rhoderick McGrigor supervised combined Western Union exercises involving ships from the British, French, and Dutch navies in June–July 1949. Admiral McGrigor flew his flag from the aircraft carrier . During the exercise, the combined force paid a visit to Mount's Bay in Cornwall from 30 June – 4 July 1949.

In late 1951,  joined the fleet as flagship of the 3rd Aircraft Carrier Squadron.

From 1947 to 1957 superfluous battleships and aircraft carriers were assigned to the Training Squadron, Home Fleet headquartered at Portland to provide basic training. The carriers stationed here were mobilised as helicopter carriers for the Suez operation in 1956. In December 1951 the Admiralty authorised the creation of a new Heavy Squadron to be assigned to the Home Fleet, consisting of the battleship Vanguard, aircraft carriers, and cruisers. Its commanding officer was known as Flag Officer, Aircraft Carriers who had administrative responsibility for all the operational carriers; the squadron was disbanded in October 1954.

After the Second World War, the Royal Navy's geographic commands were gradually merged into fewer but larger formations (1954 to 1971). After 1951 the term flotilla applied to the higher command organisation of squadrons in the Home and Mediterranean Fleets. The squadrons of the Home Fleet were grouped under a Flag Officer, Flotillas, Home Fleet, who became the main seagoing flag officer. A similar arrangement applied to the Flag Officer, Flotillas, Mediterranean Fleet. In the Far East the Flag Officer 5th Cruiser Squadron became Flag Officer Second in Command Far East Fleet with similar seagoing duties. Increasingly the term 'Submarine Flotilla' was used to describe the squadrons under command of the Flag Officer Submarines.

The Commander-in-Chief, Home Fleet, gained an additional NATO responsibility as Commander-in-Chief, Eastern Atlantic (CINCEASTLANT), as part of Allied Command Atlantic, when the NATO military command structure was established in 1953. CINCEASTLANT was set up at the Northwood Headquarters in northwest London. During Exercise Mainbrace in 1952, NATO naval forces came together for the first time to practice the defence of northern Europe, Denmark and Norway. The resulting McMahon Act difficulties caused by potential British control of the United States Navy's attack carriers armed with nuclear weapons led to the creation of a separate Striking Fleet Atlantic, directly responsible to the commander of the U.S. Navy's Atlantic Fleet, in his NATO position as SACLANT, by the end of 1952. The submarine tender  was the fleet's flagship in 1956.

In the spring of 1960, C-in-C Home Fleet moved permanently ashore to Northwood, while Flag Officer, Flotillas, Home, retained effective control at sea as the C-in-C's deputy. Another aircraft carrier, cruisers Lion and Blake; the first four guided missile destroyers, and other ships were under construction.

In February 1963 all remaining frigate and destroyer squadrons in the Home, Mediterranean and Far East Fleets were merged into new Escort Squadrons. In April 1963, the naval unit at the Northwood Headquarters, in northwest London, was commissioned as  under the command of the then Captain of the Fleet.

In December 1966, all remaining squadrons in the Home Fleet were disbanded. In 1967 the Home Fleet was amalgamated with the Mediterranean Fleet. With its area of responsibility greatly increased, the amalgamated formation was redesignated the Western Fleet.

Commanders-in-Chief 

Source for post holders after the Second World War:

Notes

Sources
 
 Lovell. Tony and Harley, Simon; (2015) "Home Fleet (Royal Navy) - The Dreadnought Project". www.dreadnoughtproject.org.
 Mackie, Colin. (2017) "Royal Navy Senior Appointments from 1865" (PDF). gulabin.com.
 Maloney, Sean. (1992), Securing Command of the Sea, Masters' thesis, University of New Brunswick. Canada.

Further reading

External links
 

Fleets of the Royal Navy
Military units and formations of the Royal Navy in World War I
Military units and formations of the Royal Navy in World War II
Military units and formations established in 1902
Military units and formations disestablished in 1967
1902 establishments in the United Kingdom